Marshall Mathers is the real name of American rapper Eminem.

Marshall Mathers may also refer to:
The Marshall Mathers LP, Eminem's 2000 album, or its title track
The Marshall Mathers LP 2, Eminem's 2013 album